Yāqūt Shihāb al-Dīn ibn-ʿAbdullāh al-Rūmī al-Ḥamawī (1179–1229) was a Muslim scholar of Byzantine Greek ancestry active during the late Abbasid period (12th-13th centuries). He is known for his , an influential work on geography containing valuable information pertaining to biography, history and literature as well as geography.

Life
Yāqūt (ruby or hyacinth) was the kunya of Ibn Abdullāh ("son of Abdullāh"). He was born in Constantinople, and as his nisba "al-Rumi" ("from Rūm") indicates he had Byzantine Greek ancestry. Yāqūt was "mawali" to ‘Askar ibn Abī Naṣr al-Ḥamawī, a trader of Baghdad, Iraq, the seat of the Abbasid Caliphate, from whom he received the laqab "Al-Hamawī".  As ‘Askar's apprentice, he learned about accounting and commerce, becoming his envoy on trade missions and travelling twice or three times to Kish in the Persian Gulf. In 1194 ‘Askar stopped his salary over some dispute and Yāqūt found work as copyist to support himself. He embarked on a course of study under the grammarian Al-‘Ukbarî. Five years later he was on another mission to Kish for ‘Askar.  On his return to Baghdad he set up as a bookseller and began his writing career.

Yāqūt spent ten years travelling in Persia, Syria, and Egypt and his significance as a scholar lies in his testimony of the great, and largely lost, literary heritage found in libraries east of the Caspian Sea, being one of the last visitors  before their destruction by Mongol invaders. He gained much material from the libraries of the ancient cities of Merv(present-day Turkmenistan), where he had studied for two years,and of Balkh.  Circa 1222 he was working on his "Geography" in Mosul and completed the first draft in 1224. In 1227 he was in Alexandria. From there he moved to Aleppo, where he died in 1229.

Works
Kitāb Mu'jam al-Buldān "Dictionary of Countries".(Ar) Book 1 (Ar) Appendix Book 1; Classified a "literary geography",  composed between 1224 and 1228, and completed a year before the author's death.  An alphabetical index of place names from the literary corpus of the Arabs, vocalizations, their Arabic or foreign derivation and location. Yaqut supplements geographic descriptions with historical, ethnographic, and associated narrative material   with historical sketches and accounts of Muslim conquests, names of governors, monuments, local celebrities etc., and preserves much valuable early literary, historical, biographic and geographic material of prose and poetry.  (ed. F. Wüstenfeld, 6 vols., Leipzig, 1866–73)
Irshād al-Arīb ilā Ma’rifat al-Adīb or "Dictionary of Learned Men of Yāqūt"; ed. D. S. Margoliouth, 7 vols. ("E. J. W. Gibb Memorial Series," vol.VI; Leiden, Brill 1907–31. download archive.org
Mu'jam al-Udabā (=Irshād al-Arīb ilā Ma’rifat al-Adīb), "Literary Encyclopedia, Expert Guide to Literature" (1226); (Ar.)  www.archive.org (Ar., Beirut, 1993).
al-Mushtarak wadh'ā wal-Muftaraq Sa'qā; 1845 edition by Ferdinand Wüstenfeld.
Marâçid; a 6-volume Latin edition by Theodor Juynboll, published as Lexicon geographicum, cui titulus est, Marâsid al ittilâ’ ‘ala asmâ’ al-amkina wa-l-biqâ, in 1852. vol.3, archive.org

Alt: 
  (alt. 1.(1866) ); 2.(1867); 3.(1868); 4.(1869); 5.(1873); 6.(1870).
Lexicon geographicum, cui titulus est, Marâsid al ittilâ’ ‘ala asmâ’ al-amkina wa-l-biqâ’, ( Observation study of placenames and sites) 6 vols, edited by T.G. Juynboll, 1852[-]64; as Marasid al-ittila’ ‘ala asma’ al-amkina wa-al-biqa’: wa-huwa mukhtasar mu’jam al-buldan li-Yaqut, 3 vols, edited by ‘Ali Muhammad al-Bajjawi, 1992
Yāqūt Ibn-ʻAbdallāh ar-Rūmī; ed. Theodor Juynboll; Lexicon geographicum, cui titulus est  Introductionem in hunc librum et annotationem in literas ; Vol.4, p. 729; Leiden, Brill (1859, Arabic-Latin)

Commentary

See also
 Ibn Battuta
 List of slaves
 List of Sunni books

Notes

References

External links
Al-Mushtarak
Yaqut's biography
Yaqut al-Hamawi, at muslimheritage.com
Literature of Travel and Exploration, An Encyclopedia three-volume set, Routledge Taylor & Francis Group
 vol.1 (1866), vol.2,(1867),  vol.3, (1868);   vol.4, (1869);  vol.5, (1873);  vol.6, (1870).

1179 births
1229 deaths
13th-century geographers
Arab explorers
Arab biographers
Arab lexicographers
Arab people of Greek descent
Geographers from the Abbasid Caliphate
Travel writers of the medieval Islamic world
Medieval Syrian geographers
Encyclopedists of the medieval Islamic world
People from Constantinople
People from Hama
Syrian people of Greek descent
12th-century Arabic poets
Arabian slaves and freedmen
Slave soldiers
Medieval slaves
Slaves from the Abbasid Caliphate
13th-century travelers